A Daughter of Australia is a 1922 Australian silent film directed by Lawson Harris. It concerns a rich squatter, Arthur Fullerton (Charles Beethan), and his daughter, Barbara (Yvonne Pavis).

It is considered a lost film.

Plot
A young English aristocrat, Hugh Ranleigh, falls for Barbara Fullerton, but is falsely accused of murdering a gambler in a  night club and escapes to Australia. He finds work on a cattle station and falls for the squatter's daughter – who turns out to be Barbara. Eventually he proves his innocence.

Cast
Lawson Harris as Hugh Ranleigh
Yvonne Pavis as Barbara Fullerton
Charles Beetham as Mr Fullerton
Charles Villiers
Dorothy Hawtree
Gilbert Emery as Jimmy
J.P. O'Neill as Irishman
Lilian Tate

Production
The film was shot for a low budget on location in Sydney, with scenes at Ascot racecourse and the Royal Easter Agricultural Show. Contrary to the experiences of many local filmmakers, authorities were keen to give the producers permission to film in public places. A shoot out was filmed in Martin Place during Sydney's rush hour which caused a commotion, and leading to two extras being injured.

Scenes were also shot at a sheep station, Dalkeith, and on a ferry in the Sydney heads.

Marie Lorraine made her film debut in the cast.

References

External links

A Daughter of Australia at National Film and Sound Archive

1922 films
Australian drama films
Australian black-and-white films
Australian silent feature films
Lost Australian films
1922 drama films
1922 lost films
Lost drama films
Silent drama films